The Jardin Exotique de Roscoff (1.6 hectares) is a botanical garden located in Roscoff, Finistère, in the region of Brittany, France. It is open daily; an admission fee is charged.

The garden was begun in 1986 when the département of Finistère purchased the rocky outcrop Roc'h Hievec, and a group of amateurs interested in subtropical plants decided to create a garden on the spot. Today the garden contains about 3,350 plants from the Southern Hemisphere, including Australia and New Zealand, the Canary Islands, and South America. Collections include acacia, agave, aloe, cactus, echium, eucalyptus, Pelargonium geranium, fuchsia, palms, passiflora, and yucca.

See also 
 List of botanical gardens in France

References 
 Jardin Exotique de Roscoff
 1001 Fleurs entry (French)
 Conservatoire des Jardins et Paysages entry (French)
 Association des Parcs et Jardins de Bretagn entry (French)
 Gralon.net entry (French)

Roscoff, Jardin Exotique de
Roscoff, Jardin Exotique de